Jean-Christophe Ammann (14 January 1939 – 13 September 2015) was a Swiss art historian and curator.

Life and work 
Born in Berlin, Ammann, son of a chemist, grew up in a German-speaking family in Fribourg. He actually wanted to become a doctor, but after his Matura in 1959 at the Collège Saint-Michel he studied history of art, Biblical archaeology and German literature. In 1966, he received his doctorate from the University of Fribourg on the work of Louis Moilliet. From 1966 to 1968, he was an assistant to Harald Szeemann at the Kunsthalle Bern. He then directed the Kunstmuseum Luzern until 1977. In 1971, he was Swiss commissioner for the Biennale Paris and in 1972 he worked with Harald Szeemann on the conception of documenta 5, which "went down in exhibition history as the most interesting and influential" In 1978, he was co-organiser of Arte Natura in the international pavilion of the Venice Biennale.

Ammann was married to the artist Judith Ammann and lived in Frankfurt. He died in September 2015 at the age of 76.

Kunsthalle Basel 
From 1978 to 1988, he took over the management of the Kunsthalle Basel. Among the conditions of his inauguration were better lighting conditions, partial removal of the wooden panelling on the walls, a continuous coat of unbroken white paint. He held six exhibitions a year with international as well as Swiss artists, including Gilbert & George, Martin Disler, Helmut Federle, Mario Merz and Rolf Winnewisser, whom he had already presented in Lucerne. With a penchant for painting, Ammann presented Enzo Cucchi, Nicola de Maria, Francesco Clemente, Walter Dahn, Rainer Fetting, Georg Baselitz in Basel. Miriam Cahn had the first institutional exhibition in 1983 with charcoal drawings. In 1987, he showed light installations by James Turrell "opening our earth to the cosmic". In 1988 he opened the Kunsthalle to Richard Serra, who covered each of the long side walls of the skylight hall with a strip of the densest graffiti hatching and achieved a fantastic change in the spatial effect. His 60 or so exhibitions in Basel followed a wide variety and were not restricted by formal or ideological boundaries. The works shown asserted themselves "... through "quality", for every art lover a fixed but never quite definable quantity. For Ammann, it is expressed, among other things, in the sum of the "energy" that a creative work must possess." In addition, he ensured that a sculpture by Serra was installed in Basel's Wenkenpark.

Museum for modern art 
In 1989, Ammann moved to Frankfurt and opened there as director on 6 June 1991 the new museum designed by the Viennese architect Hans Hollein designed Museum für Moderne Kunst. The new museum gained international renown with a new form of exhibition, the "Szenenwechsel", which was held every six months and took place a total of twenty times with the help of private sponsors. During the Szenenwechsel, the museum's holdings were rearranged every six months and enriched with new acquisitions, loans or special exhibitions.

In 1995, Ammann was commissioner of the German pavilion at the Venice Biennale.

In 1999, Ammann was commissioned by Deutsche Börse to build up a collection of artistic photographs. He was also a member of the advisory board of the art collection of the Swiss banking house UBS. As curator, he was responsible, among other things, for the exhibition Crossart. Between 2010 and 2015, he curated (with Anna Wesle) several exhibitions at the Museum Franz Gertsch in Burgdorf/Switzerland and at the Galerie Perpétuel in Frankfurt.

Legacy 
After leaving the Museum für Moderne Kunst in 2001, Ammann left the museum several works from his private collection as well as his collected correspondence, which was inventoried in the Archive Jean-Christophe Ammann and documents 35 years of his curatorial activity.

Curations 
Ammann curated other exhibitions (selection): :
 , Anke Röhrscheid, Elly Strick, Kunsthalle Palazzo, Liestal, Basel (2007).
 Songlines, Balthasar Burkhard, Museum Franz Gertsch – Burgdorf Schweiz (2007)
 Elly Strik, Laboratorio, Kunsthalle Lugano (2008)
 Sammlung Deutsche Börse mit Anne-Marie Beckmann, CO Berlin (2009)
 Scent of Desire, Balthasar Burkhard, Museum im Bellpark, Kriens (Lucern) (2009)
 Martina Essig, Laboratorio, Kunsthalle Lugano (2009)
 Die Bilder tun was mit mir: Sammlung Frieder Burda, Museum Frieder Burda, Baden-Baden (in cooperation with Patricia Kamp) (2010)
 A rebours: Martin Eder, Elly Strik, Caro Suerkemper, Christoph Wachter, Paris (2010).
 Joseph Beuys – Energieplan, Stiftung Schloss Moyland (2010)
 Kathrin Borer, Laboratorio, Kunsthalle Lugano (2010)
 Annika van Vugt, foundation of the  1822, Frankfurt (2015).

Quote

Awards 
 1993 – Deutscher Kritikerpreis für Bildende Kunst
 1999 – French Ordre des Arts et des Lettres (Officer)
 2001 – , Munich
 2003 – Goethe Plaque of the City of Frankfurt
 2006 – Laureate of the  Dr.-Herbert-Zapp-Initiativ-Preises

Publications
 Bei näherer Betrachtung. Zeitgenössische Kunst verstehen und deuten. Westend Verlag, Frankfurt, 2009, .
 French edition: En y regardant mieux. Les Presses du Reél, Dijon, 2010, .
 Ein Briefwechsel (with ). Exhibition catalogue. Publisher: Galerie Bernd Slutzky, Frankfurt, 2001, 
 with Harald Szeemann: Von Hodler zur Antiform, Geschichte der Kunsthalle Bern. Benteli Verlag, Bern 1970, new edition 2005.
 Louis Moilliet. Das Gesamtwerk. DuMont Schauberg, Cologne, 1972.
 with Christmut Präger: Museum für Moderne Kunst und Sammlung Ströher, Schriften des Museums für Moderne Kunst, Frankfurt 1992. 
 Bewegung im Kopf. Lindinger + Schmid, Regensburg 1993.
 Rémy Zaugg – Gespräche mit Jean-Christophe Ammann. Cantz Verlag, Parkett Verlag, Stuttgart 1994.
 with Rolf Lauter: Peter Fischli; David Weiss: Raum unter der Treppe, Schriften des Museums für Moderne Kunst, Frankfurt 1995. 
 Kulturfinanzierung. Lindinger + Schmid, Regensburg 1995.
 Annäherung. Über die Notwendigkeit der Kunst. Lindinger + Schmid, Regensburg 1996.
 Alighiero Boetti 1965-1994, Galleria Civica d'Arte Moderna e Contemporanea, Turin, 1996; Musée d'Art Moderne, Villeneuve d'Ascq, 1996-1997; Museum Moderner Kunst, Stiftung Ludwig Wien, 20er Haus, 1997. 
 Das Glück zu sehen. Kunst beginnt dort, wo der Geschmack aufhört. Regensburg: Lindinger und Schmid, 1998, .
 . Musik sehen, Bilder hören. Published by Verein ZwischenZeit, with a foreword by Jean-Christophe Ammann, Schwabe Verlag, Basel 2010, .
 Bei näherer Betrachtung. Westend Verlag, Frankfurt 2007.
 Bei näherer Betrachtung. Westend Verlag, 3rd extended edition, Frankfurt  2009.
 En y regardant mieux. Les presses du réel, Saint-Etienne 2010.
 Kunst? – Ja, Kunst – Die Sehnsucht der Bilder. Westend Verlag, Frankfurt 2014.
 Alighiero Boetti, Catalogo Generale. Electa Editore, Milan, Volume I, 2011; Volume II, 2012; Volume III/1, 2015.
 Alighiero Boetti, Catalogo Generale. Tomo primo, 1961–1971, Miland 2009.
 Alighiero Boetti, Catalogo Generale. Tomo secondo, 1972–1978, Miland 2012.
 Alighiero Boetti, Catalogo Generale. Tomo terzo, parte I, 1979–1987, Miland 2015

References

Further reading 
 Rolf Lauter (ed.): Für Jean-Christophe Ammann, Festschrift zum 60. Geburtstag, Societätsverlag, Frankfurt am Main, 2001 .
 Jean-Christophe Ammann in Munzinger-Archiv (Start of article freely available)
 Annemarie Monteil: Die Ära Ammann in der Kunsthalle Basel. In Basler Stadtbuch 1988, .

External links 
 
 
 
 Ronja Merkel: Eine lebende Legende – Der frühere MMK-Direktor Jean-Christophe Ammann. Journal Frankfurt, 16. Dezember 2014
 Literatur von und über Jean-Christophe Ammann 
 
 Ammann, Jean-Christophe in 

Swiss art historians
Swiss curators
Swiss art curators
Academic staff of Goethe University Frankfurt
Documenta
20th-century Swiss non-fiction writers
21st-century Swiss non-fiction writers
Officiers of the Ordre des Arts et des Lettres
1939 births
2015 deaths
Writers from Berlin